Hannes Rumm (born 11 November 1968) is an Estonian journalist and politician. He was a member of XI Riigikogu.

He has been a member of Estonian Social Democratic Party.

In 2004 he was awarded with Order of the Cross of the Eagle, IV class.

References

Living people
1968 births
Estonian journalists
Social Democratic Party (Estonia) politicians
Recipients of the Military Order of the Cross of the Eagle, Class IV
University of Tartu alumni
People from Rakvere
Members of the Riigikogu, 2007–2011